The National Democratic Party (Hizb al Wataniyah al Dimuqratiyah) is an Iraqi Secular political party. The party was founded after the 2003 invasion of Iraq, as several Iraqis, including Naseer al-Chaderchi, son of former leader Kamil al-Chaderchi, and Abdel Amir Abbud Rahima, sought to revive the historic National Democratic Party.

The party ran in the 2005 Iraqi election and received 36,795 votes, sufficient to win one seat. It lost parliamentary representation in the December 2005 elections, but a leading member, Hashim Abderrahman al-Shibli was nominated as Minister of Justice by the Iraqi National List.

In the 2009 governorate election in Basrah, the party is contesting on the list 'National Tendency', together with the Iraqi Communist Party, Popular Democratic Gathering and Independent Sons of Iraq.

Naseer al-Chaderchi is a former leader of the party The party's current leader is Abid Faisal Ihmaid, father of Member of the European Parliament Abir Al-Sahlani.

References

2003 establishments in Iraq
Nationalist parties in Iraq
Political parties established in 2003
Political parties in Iraq
Secularism in Iraq
Social democratic parties in Iraq